Dracaena suffruticosa, synonym Sansevieria suffruticosa is a species of Dracaena native to eastern Africa, from Ethiopia to Malawi. The first description of the species was made in 1915 by N. E. Brown.

Description
It forms a short stem and grows its leaves in a rosette or sometimes in two spiraling rows (spiral distichous). Its spine-tipped leaves are 12-16mm thick, elliptical (rather than round) in cross-section, and pale to dark green depending on sun exposure. 

It very closely resembles the smaller related species, Dracaena serpenta and the more distichous species Dracaena phillipsiae. In its native habitat it often grows in dry or rocky ground, and is highly drought tolerant.

References 

House plants
suffruticosa
Taxa named by N. E. Brown
Taxa named by Maarten J. M. Christenhusz
Taxa named by James W. Byng
Plants described in 1861